Richard James Leroy Mallory (born 10 August 1942) was a Bermudian professional footballer who played as a winger.

Career
Born in Bermuda, Mallory impressed enough to be offered a chance with Cardiff City. He made four first team appearances as the club suffered an injury crisis at the start of the 1963–64 season but was released at the end of the campaign, returning to Bermuda.

References

1942 births
Bermudian footballers
Cardiff City F.C. players
English Football League players
Association football wingers
Living people